The following list consists of episodes from the CBBC children's sitcom Millie inbetween.

Series overview

Episodes

Series 1 (2014)

Series 2 (2015–16)

Special (2016)

Series 3 (2016–17)

Series 4 (2017–18)

Specials (2018)

References

External links

Millie Inbetween